is a video game composer and sound designer best known for his work with Capcom, who normally went by the alias of Bun Bun.

During the NES era, he worked on the music for Mega Man 3 (in lieu of Harumi Fujita), Tenchi wo Kurau II, The Little Mermaid, and Darkwing Duck for Capcom. After the NES era, he created the majority of the music for Breath of Fire, while doing a few pieces for Final Fight 2, along with a few other projects. He was also one of the keyboardists for the Capcom house band, Alph Lyla, before they disbanded in the late 1990s. He also designed the well known 16-bit era Capcom logo jingle.

Works
''

References

External links
 Official website

Year of birth missing (living people)
Alph Lyla members
Capcom people
Chiptune musicians
Japanese composers
Japanese male composers
Living people
Musicians from Hiroshima Prefecture
Japanese sound designers
Video game composers